Abdelhameed Shabana (born 2 October 1985) is an Egyptian footballer who is currently a free agent. He is an electrifying attacking midfielder, who can also play as a striker or a winger.

Abdelhameed Shabana is well known for crashing the top clubs of Egypt with his famous goals against Zamalek, Al-Ahly and Ismaily.

National Teams

He has been a regular international for the Egypt U20 and Egypt U23 team, and played in the African Games qualifiers, as well as winning the Qatar U23 Cup.

Club statistics

Honors

with Al-Ahly
Egyptian Premier League (2010-2011)

with Churchill Brothers
Federation Cup (2014)

References

1985 births
Living people
Egyptian footballers
People from Monufia Governorate
Association football midfielders